The Oregon City Transit Center is a TriMet transit center located at McLoughlin Blvd. and 11th Street in Oregon City, Oregon. The northwest end of the center is at McLoughlin Blvd. and the southeast end is at Main Street, while Moss Street and 11th Street run through the center and are restricted to buses only.

TriMet bus lines

The following bus routes serve the transit center:
 31-Webster Rd
 32-Oatfield
 33-McLoughlin/King Rd
 34-Linwood/River Rd                        
 35-Macadam/Greeley   
 79-Clackamas/Oregon City
 99-Macadam/McLoughlin (express route)
 154-Willamette/Clackamas Heights

Other bus connections
The center is also served by:
 Canby Area Transit (CAT)

See also
 List of TriMet transit centers

References

External links
Oregon City Transit Center – TriMet page

1991 establishments in Oregon
Buildings and structures in Oregon City, Oregon
Transportation buildings and structures in Clackamas County, Oregon
TriMet transit centers